Milestones Professional is a project scheduling software developed by KIDASA Software, Inc., based in Austin, Texas, founded in 1989. Milestones Professional is a Windows-based program designed to create presentation-ready Gantt Charts and schedules for users.

Features 
 Gantt Chart Creation
 Import from Microsoft Project
 Calculate Earned Value

Product History 
KIDASA Software, Inc. was founded in 1989, and released Milestones, Etc. 1.0 in the same year. Since that time, KIDASA has released a new version about once every 2 years, the latest being Milestones Professional 2021. The company also has a lower-priced version with fewer features, called Milestones Simplicity, . 

The software is designed with mostly presentation in mind, with "Microsoft Project 2003 for Dummies" noting that, "Milestones Professional 2002's strength is in the way it allows you to communicate project information. Using Milestones Professional you can customize schedules to print out and distribute with a handy viewer for those who neither have Project nor Milestones, publish to the internet with an easy-to-use feature, and generate color reports to add an impact to project presentations."

Milestones Professional is also widely used in the aerospace industry. Milestones Professional has been shown to reduce total project costs through automation.

Reviews 
Milestones Professional has been reviewed at 2020Software.com, Golden Triangle PC Club, Bright Hub, PCMag.com, and InfoWorld

References

External links 
 KIDASA Software, Inc. Website

Project management software
1989 software
Business software for Windows